A moment magnitude 5.7 earthquake struck Doti District, Sudurpashchim Province, Nepal on 9 November 2022. The earthquake was widely felt in western Nepal and northern India.

Tectonic setting
Nepal lies in the Himalayas, which were created as a result of the Indian Plate colliding with the Eurasian Plate, forming the Main Himalayan Thrust.

Earthquakes are common in Nepal. In 1934, a magnitude 8.0 earthquake struck Sagarmatha, killing over 10,700 in Nepal and in Bihar, India. A magnitude 6.9 earthquake struck eastern Nepal in 1988, killing over 700. In 2015, a magnitude 7.8 earthquake killed over 8,900 in central Nepal, many in the capital Kathmandu.

Earthquake
The earthquake was felt by over 42.1 million people across Nepal, India and China. The earthquake occurred as a result of reverse faulting. It was felt as far away as the Indian capital of New Delhi, approximately 400 km (250 mi) away.

Impact

Nepal
Six people, including four minors were killed, all of whom died when a house collapsed in Doti District. Twelve others were injured, five of them seriously, 924 houses collapsed and 5,186 others were damaged.

India
In the city of Rudrapur in the state of Uttarakhand, a young woman was injured while fleeing in panic. In the village of Bhanti in Almora district, cracks appeared in several houses. In Shravasti district, in Uttar Pradesh, the quake caused cracks to appear in the floors of a house. Cracks also appeared in several old houses in Bhinga, where power outages occurred.

12 November aftershock

At 8:12 p.m. local time, the largest aftershock of  5.2 struck near the Bajhang District. Additional damage to previously weakened houses was caused there, and a 66-year old person in the neighboring district of Baitadi died while fleeing his home in panic.

Notes

See also 

List of earthquakes in 2022
List of earthquakes in Nepal
List of earthquakes in India

References

External links

M 5.6 - NEPAL - 2022-11-08 20:27:22 UTC - European-Mediterranean Seismological Centre

2022 disasters in Nepal
Earthquakes in Nepal
Earthquakes in India
N
2022 in Nepal
November 2022 events in Nepal
2022 disasters in India